This list of Alawites includes prominent Alawite figures, mostly Syrians, who are notable in their areas of expertise.

Academics 

 Uğur Şahin, German oncologist and immunologist. He is the CEO of BioNTech, which developed one of the major vaccines against COVID-19

Arts, culture, and entertainment
Adunis, poet
Badawi al-Jabal, poet
Jamal Suliman, film producer
Hasan al-Khayer, poet
Suzan Najm Aldeen, actress
Haluk Levent, Turkish singer
Taim Hasan, actor
Fadwa Soliman, actress
Wafa Sultan, Syrian-American writer
Dina Haroun, actress
Farrah Yousef, singer.
Sadallah Wanous, Playwright
Samar Yazbek, writer

Economy
Mohammed Makhlouf, Syrian businessman
Rami Makhlouf, Syrian businessman

Government and politics
Hafez al-Assad
Bashar al-Assad
Salah Jadid
Zaki al-Arsuzi
Ali Sulayman al-Assad
Rifaat al-Assad
Jamil al-Assad
Bushra al-Assad
Vahap Seçer, Mayor of Mersin
Zeydan Karalar, Mayor of Adana
Zulema Yoma
Mohammed Nasif Kheirbek
Ghazi Kanaan
Ali Eid, former leader of the Arab Democratic Party of Lebanon
Rifaat Eid, current leader of the ADP
Ahmad Hassan
Muhammad Khayr Bey
Muhsen Bilal
Ali Hammoud
Monzer Makhous

Military and security
Saleh al-Ali
Ali Aslan
Maher al-Assad
Bassel al-Assad
Assef Shawkat
Hafez Makhlouf
Dhu al-Himma Shalish
Ali Haydar
Atef Najib
Abdel-Fatah Qudsiyeh
Ali Abdullah Ayyoub
Muhammad al-Khuli
Jamil Hassan (military officer)
Mohammed Dib Zaitoun
Ali Duba
Shafiq Fayadh
Adnan Badr Hassan
Ali Habib Mahmud
Mihrac Ural, Turkish guerrilla fighter, leader of the Syrian Resistance

Religion
Ibn Nusayr - Founder of the Alawites
Al-Khaṣībī, a 10th-century scholar of the Alawites
Salman al-Murshid, Founder of an offshoot of the Alawites called the Al-Murshidiyah

References

 
Alawites